Tusom is a Tangkhulic language of Manipur, India. Dialects include East Tusom (Mortensen 2013). Tusom was first mentioned in the literature by David Mortensen in the 2000s.

References

Sources
Mortensen, David R. and James A. Miller (2013). “A reconstruction of Proto-Tangkhulic rhymes.” Linguistics of the Tibeto-Burman Area 36(1): 1-32.
Mortensen, David R. (2012). Database of Tangkhulic Languages. (unpublished ms. contributed to STEDT).
Mortensen, David R. and James A. Miller (2009). “Proto-Tangkhul Onsets in Comparative Perspective.” International Conference on Sino-Tibetan Languages and Linguistics 42, Chiangmai, November 4. 
Mortensen, David R. (2003). “Comparative Tangkhul.” Unpublished Qualifying Paper, UC Berkeley.
Mortensen, David. 2014. The Tangkhulic Tongues - How I Started Working on Endangered Languages.

Tangkhulic languages